The Church of San José (Spanish: Iglesia de San José) is a church located on the Calle de Alcalá in Madrid, Spain. It was declared Bien de Interés Cultural in 1995.

See also 
Catholic Church in Spain
List of oldest church buildings

References

External links 

Jose
Baroque architecture in Madrid
Bien de Interés Cultural landmarks in Madrid
Calle de Alcalá
Buildings and structures in Justicia neighborhood, Madrid